Prothro is a surname. Notable people with the surname include:

Chris Prothro (born 1982), American baseball coach and player
Doc Prothro (1893–1971), American baseball player and manager
Tommy Prothro (1920–1995), American football coach
Tyrone Prothro (born 1984), American football player